Anup Kumar is a Fiji Indian politician who won the Vanua Levu West Indian Communal Constituency, one of the 19 seats reserved for Fiji citizens of Indian origin, for the Fiji Labour Party during the 1999 elections for the House of Representatives. He then became the Minister for Commerce, Business Development & Investment in the People's Coalition Government led by Mahendra Chaudhry.

On 19 May 2000, he was among the 43 members of the People's Coalition Government, led by Mahendra Chaudhry, taken hostage by George Speight and his band of rebel Republic of Fiji Military Forces (RFMF) soldiers from the Counter Revolutionary Warfare Unit. He was released on  12 July 2000.

References

Year of birth missing (living people)
Living people
Fijian Hindus
Fiji Labour Party politicians
Indian members of the House of Representatives (Fiji)
Government ministers of Fiji
Politicians from Macuata Province